Aditya Redij  is an Indian television actor known for portraying Raghav Saghvan in Na Aana Is Des Laado, Prithvi in Junoon – Aisi Nafrat Toh Kaisa Ishq and Shiva Lashkare in Colors TV's Bawara Dil opposite Kinjal Dhamecha.

Personal life 
Redij got engaged to girlfriend Natasha Sharma on 29 April 2012. They got married in 2014. The duo welcomed their first child, a son in October 2022.

Filmography

Television

Films

Awards and nominations

References

External links

Living people
Place of birth missing (living people)
Indian male film actors
Indian male television actors
21st-century Indian male actors
1984 births